Tame Keva? is a 2018 Gujarati social drama film starring Jakir Khan and  Anand Devmani produced by Dr K R Films. This film is based on urban casteism.

Plot 
Ramji, and old Dalit man is frustrated and annoyed because of casteism around his personal and professional life. Ramji wants to give up his relion but his wife is against it. In second story, Vishesh is a boy from rich but lower cast family. He wants to marry his girlfriend vasundhara but Vasundhara's father is against this marriage because of Vishesh's lower cast.

Cast 

 Jakir Khan
 Anand Devmani
 Shraddha Suthar
 Jaikrishna Rathod

Release 
The film was released on 27 April 2018 across Gujarat

References 

Films shot in Gujarat
2018 films
Indian drama films
2010s Gujarati-language films
2018 drama films